The Dirty Version is the first solo studio album by American rapper and producer A.G. of Diggin' in the Crates Crew. It was released on September 21, 1999 through Silva Dom Records with distribution via Landspeed Records. Production was handled by several record producers, including Buckwild, Diamond D, DJ Premier, Lord Finesse, Showbiz and A.G. It features guest appearances from Big Pun, Fat Joe, Guru, Kool Chuck, KRS-One, O.C., and the Ghetto Dwellas among others.

Track listing

Notes
Track 1 features vocals from Party Arty and D Flow with additional vocals from Hehdkrack
Tracks 2 and 12 feature additional vocals from Party Arty and D Flow
Tracks 3, 13, 16 and 18 feature vocals from Party Arty and D Flow
Track 4 features vocals from Party Arty, D Flow and Fat Joe
Tracks 5 and 14 feature additional vocals from Hehdkrack and Mr. Mudd
Track 6 features vocals from Kool Chuck and Diamond D with additional vocals from Blake Carrington
Track 7 features additional vocals from Mr. Mudd
Track 8 features vocals from Hehdkrack, Misery, Reality, Doe and Big Cle
Track 9 features vocals from O.C. and Guru with additional vocals from Mr. Mudd
Track 10 features vocals from Wali World
Track 11 features vocals from Teck 9 and Kool Chuck with additional vocals from Mr. Mudd and D Flow
Track 15 features vocals from KRS-One and Big Pun
Track 17 features vocals from Murda Cap, Firehead and Party Arty

Personnel
 Andre "A.G." Barnes – main artist, vocals, mixing (track 7), producer (tracks: 16, 18), co-executive producer

 Arthur "Party Arty" Sheridan – vocals (tracks: 1, 3, 4, 13, 16-18), additional vocals (tracks: 2, 12), creative coordinator
 Damon "D Flow" Graham – vocals (tracks: 1, 3, 4, 13, 16, 18), additional vocals (tracks: 2, 11, 12), creative coordinator
 Joseph "Fat Joe" Cartagena – vocals (track 4)
 Kool Chuck – vocals (tracks: 6, 11)
 Joseph "Diamond D" Kirkland – vocals & producer (track 6)
 Boo Ha Hehdkrack – vocals & producer (track 8), additional vocals (tracks: 1, 5, 14)
 Big Cle – vocals (track 8)
 Doe – vocals (track 8)
 Misery – vocals (track 8)
 Reality – vocals (track 8)
 Omar "O.C." Credle – vocals (track 9)
 Keith "GuRu" Elam – vocals (track 9)
 Wali Burgos – vocals (track 10), producer (tracks: 7, 13)
 Teck 9 – vocals (track 11)
 Lawrence "KRS-One" Parker – vocals (track 15)
 Christopher "Big Pun" Rios – vocals (track 15)
 Firehead – vocals (track 17)
 Murda Cap – vocals (track 17)
 Mr Mudd – additional vocals (tracks: 5, 7, 9, 11, 14)
 Blake Carrington – additional vocals (track 6)
 Robert "Lord Finesse" Hall – producer (tracks: 1, 4)
 Anthony "Buckwild" Best – producer (tracks: 2, 17)
 Steve Bundy Wade – mixing & producer (track 3)
 Rodney "Showbiz" LeMay – producer (tracks: 5, 15)
 Christopher "DJ Premier" Martin – producer (track 9)
 Amed Harris – producer (tracks: 10, 12), mixing (track 12)
 Garth Mitchel – producer (track 11), mixing (tracks: 11, 16)
 A.C.E. – producer (track 13)
 Devon "Gritty Traxx" Gray – producer (track 14)
 Alon "Pac Man" Cohen – mixing (track 1)
 E-Plugg – mixing (tracks: 2, 5, 8, 10, 12, 13, 17, 18)
 Ken Johnston – mixing (tracks: 3, 7)
 Eric Lynch – mixing (tracks: 4, 14)
 Al Boogie – mixing (track 6)
 Eddie Sancho – mixing (tracks: 9, 15)
 Chris Athens – mastering
 Naomi Silva – executive producer
 Kevin Henson – art direction, design
 Khalid Kenyatta Shabazz – A&R
 Aimee Morris – management
 Diana Blain – management

References

External links

1999 albums
Showbiz and A.G. albums
Albums produced by Buckwild
Albums produced by Diamond D
Albums produced by DJ Premier
Albums produced by Lord Finesse
Albums produced by Showbiz (producer)